{{DISPLAYTITLE:C15H20O}}
The molecular formula C15H20O (molar mass: 216.319 g/mol, exact mass: 216.1514 u) may refer to:

 Curzerene
 Hexyl cinnamaldehyde
 Mutisianthol

Molecular formulas